The 2022 SA National Swimming Championships was held from 6 to 11 April 2022 in Gqeberha, South Africa at the Newton Park Swimming Pool. Events were competed in a long course (50 metres long) swimming pool. It served as a selection meet for determining the swimmers to represent South Africa at the 2022 World Aquatics Championships and 2022 Commonwealth Games. It was held concurrently with the 2022 SA National Junior Swimming Championships as part of the multi-sport 2022 Telkom SA National Aquatic Championships. The meet was open to international competition and included multi-class para swimming events.

Event schedule
A total of 62 events were competed over six days, including 18 para swimming events. For para swimming events, men and women had the same schedule. Heats started at 07:30 on days one and four, and started at 08:30 on days two, three, five, and six. Senior finals started at 18:00 each day.

Overall results
Key:

Men

 Coetze swam a FINA "A" cut time of 53.96 seconds in the heats.
 Houlie swam a FINA "A" cut time, though was not automatically qualified for the 2022 World Aquatics Championships team as he did not qualify in an Olympic event.
 Coetze swam a FINA "A" cut time of 22.15 seconds in the 50 metre freestyle for the lead-off leg of the relay.

Women

Mixed

Medal table

Qualification via time trial 
The following qualifying time was achieved during a time trial conducted as part of the Championships.

Records set

Men

Women

Broadcast
A live broadcast of day one was aired on YouTube by Swimming South Africa. Days two, three, four, five, and six were streamed live as well. Aired broadcasts were continuous stream format, meaning they covered heats through finals, and were segmented into two videos if exceeding 12 hours in length.

Participating nations
Athletes from countries including the following participated at the Championships.

  (BOTS)
  (GBR)
  (IND)
  (CDTM)
  (NAM)
  (RSA, by region)
  (SEY)
  (ZAM)
  (ZIM)

South Africa regional representation
Athletes from South Africa competed on teams by province/region, including the following.

 Ekurhuleni, Gauteng (Aquatics Guateng Ekurhuleni - AGA)
 Johannesburg, Gauteng (Aquatics Guateng Johannesburg - AGB)
 Tshwane, Gauteng (Aquatics Guateng Tshwane - AGC)
 Eastern Cape (Eastern Cape Aquatics - ECA)
 FAAC
 Free State (FSA)
 HAM
 KwaZulu-Natal (KZNA)
 Limpopo (LP)
 Mpumalanga (MPA)
 North West (North West Swimming - NWS)
 Western Cape (Western Cape Aquatics - WCA)

See also
 South Africa at the 2022 Commonwealth Games
 South Africa at the 2022 World Aquatics Championships
 Telkom SA National Aquatic Championships
 List of swimming competitions

References

Swimming competitions in South Africa
SA National Swimming Championships
SA National Swimming Championships